Massimo Berdini (born 3 October 1958) is a retired Italian football player.

His debut game in the 1977–78 season for A.S. Roma remained his only game in Serie A. He also made 26 appearances in Serie C2 for Omegna.

References

1958 births
Living people
Footballers from Rome
Italian footballers
Association football defenders
A.S. Roma players
U.S. Viterbese 1908 players
Serie A players